Sauveur Gandolfi-Scheit (born 19 January 1947 in Bastia, Haute-Corse) was a member of the National Assembly of France.  He represented Haute-Corse's 1st constituency from 2007 to 2017, as a member of the Union for a Popular Movement.

References

1947 births
Living people
People from Bastia
Corsican politicians
Union for the New Republic politicians
Union of Democrats for the Republic politicians
Rally for the Republic politicians
Union for a Popular Movement politicians
The Strong Right
The Popular Right
Deputies of the 13th National Assembly of the French Fifth Republic
Deputies of the 14th National Assembly of the French Fifth Republic